Shyga! The Sunlight Mound is the fourth studio album by Australian psychedelic rock band Psychedelic Porn Crumpets. It was released on 5 February 2021 by What Reality? Records and Marathon Artists.

At the 2021 ARIA Music Awards, the album was nominated for Best Hard Rock or Heavy Metal Album.

Background
Majority of the album was written and recorded in lead vocalist Jack McEwan's home due to the COVID-19 pandemic.

Release
The band announced their fourth studio album on 15 October 2020.

Singles
On 5 August 2020, the band released the first single "Mr. Prism". Of the single, McEwan said: "After our last tour of Europe I had a plethora of reasons to see a doctor. I was pushing through on all sorts of meds until someone offered me an alternative and I realised no matter how sick I’d ever be, I could never turn one down. Mr. Prism (my sickly fun-fuelled fiend of an alter-ego) was born." Psychedelic Porn Crumpets released the official music video on their YouTube on 26 August 2020.

The second single "Tally-Ho" was released on 15 October 2020. The official music video was released on YouTube on 5 November 2020.

The third single "Pukebox" was released on 13 January 2021. It was recorded at McEwan's home studio and Tone City Studios in Western Australia. The official video was put up on YouTube on 1 February 2021.

Critical reception
Shyga! The Sunlight Mound was met with "generally favorable" reviews from critics. At Metacritic, which assigns a weighted average rating out of 100 to reviews from mainstream publications, this release received an average score of 80 based on 8 reviews. AnyDecentMusic? gave the release a 7.3 out of 10 based on a critical consensus of 7 reviews.

In a review for Beats Per Minute, Conor Lochrie explained: "The first half of Shyga! contains most of the sharper hits, while the guitars on the second half are allowed to roam looser and longer. Apart from a few tracks like the interlude "Round The Corner", the guitar riffs dominate. They thrash and fizz and never let up; it can have a bit of an enervating effect after so much." Megan Walder of Clash said: "With the high energy psychedelic haze that metamorphosises around anything this band touch, their exploration of complexities forever surprise.  And such stress unites with excitement as we become the very embodiment of an album we have longed for. In fact, it almost didn't matter what SHYGA! The Sunlight Mound contained, as long as it was quintessential Psychedelic Porn Crumpets."

Writing for DIY, Ollie Rankine said: "SHYGA! The Sunlight Mound sets its sights on something larger by dressing up fuzzy, high-intensity pop songs into ambitious prospects of sold-out stadium performances. Whether or not these expectations are realistic, the band seem determined to believe in the hype. As it hurtles uncontrollably down the tracks, the album is an accelerating freight train of insatiable guitar hero pageantry that rarely slows to catch its breath."

Commercial performance
In Australia, Shyga! The Sunlight Mound debuted at number four on the ARIA charts in the week of 15 February 2021. The release also debuted at number two on the ARIA Top 20 Australian Albums Chart.

Track listing

Charts

References

External links
 
 

2021 albums
Marathon Artists albums